The Roman Catholic Diocese of Geraldton is a Latin Rite suffragan diocese in the ecclesiastical province of the Metropolitan Archdiocese of Perth, covering the Mid West, Western Australia.

Its cathedral episcopal see is St Francis Xavier Cathedral, in Geraldton.

History 
Established on 30 January 1898 as Diocese of Geraldton / Geraldtonen(sis) (Latin), on territory split off from the then Diocese of Perth (now its Metropolitan).

Statistics 
As per 2014, it pastorally served 29,700 Catholics (23.1% of 128,800 total) on 131,831 km² in 16 parishes and 24 missions with 18 priests (12 diocesan, 6 religious), 35 lay religious (10 brothers, 25 sisters), 3 seminarians.

Parishes 
The diocese has fifteen parishes with regular liturgical services held in the following locations, with churches dedicated to particular saints:
Geraldton (Cathedral of St Francis Xavier), Greenough (St Peter), and Rangeway (St John)
Bluff Point (St Lawrence) and Wonthella (St Patrick)
Carnarvon (St Mary Star of the Sea) and Exmouth (St John)
Dongara (Our Lady Star of the Sea) and Leeman (Mary Queen of Peace)
Karratha (St Paul), Dampier (St Peter), and Wickham (Our Lady of the Pilbara)
Leonora (Sacred Heart), Laverton (Christ the Redeemer), and Leinster
Morawa (Holy Cross)
Mt Magnet (St Brigid), Meekatharra (Christ the King), and Cue (St Patrick)
Mullewa (Our Lady of Mt Carmel) and Mingenew (St Joseph)
Newman (St Joseph)
Northampton (Our Lady in Ara Coeli), Kalbarri (Our Lady Help of Christians), and Nanson (Our Lady of Fatima)
Port Hedland (St Cecilia)
South Hedland (St John the Baptist)
Three Springs (St Paul), Perenjori (St Joseph), Coorow (Our Lady Queen of Peace), and Carnamah (St Andrew)
Tom Price (St Thomas) and Paraburdoo (St Theresa)

Bishops

Episcopal ordinaries
The following individuals have been elected as Roman Catholic Suffragan Bishops of Geraldton (all Roman rite) :
{| class="wikitable"
!Order
!Name
!Date enthroned
!Reign ended
!Term of office
!Reason for term end
|-
|align="center"| ||William Bernard Kelly † ||align="center" |21 March 1898 ||align="center" |26 December 1921 ||align="right"| ||Died in office
|-
|align="center"| ||Richard Ryan, Congregation of the Mission (C.M.) ||align="center" |30 January 1923, previously Apostolic Vicar of Kimberley in Western Australia (1894 – 1909) ||align="center" |10 March 1926 ||align="right"| ||Appointed Bishop of Sale (Australia) (1926.03.10 – 1957.06.16)
|-
|align="center"| ||James Patrick O'Collins † ||align="center" |11 February 1930 ||align="center" |23 December 1941 ||align="right"| ||Appointed Bishop of Ballarat (Australia) (1941.12.23 – 1971.05.01)
|-
|align="center"| ||Alfred Gummer † ||align="center" |24 February 1942 ||align="center" |5 April 1962 ||align="right"| ||Died in office
|-
|align="center"| ||Francis Xavier Thomas † ||align="center" |18 June 1962 ||align="center" |31 July 1981 ||align="right"| ||Retired as Bishop Emeritus of Geraldton
|-
|align="center"| ||William Foley † ||align="center" |13 July 1981 ||align="center" |26 October 1983 ||align="right"| ||Elevated as Metropolitan Archbishop of Perth (1983.10.26 – 1991.02.10)
|-
|align="center"| ||Barry Hickey ||align="center" |22 March 1984 ||align="center" |23 July 1991 ||align="right"| ||Elevated as Metropolitan Archbishop of Perth (1991.07.23 – 2012.02.20), also Vice-President of Australian Catholic Bishops Conference (2006.05.05 – 2012.05.04)
|-
|align="center"| ||Justin Joseph Bianchini ||align="center" |25 March 1992 ||align="center" |15 May 2017||align="right"|  ||Retired as Bishop Emeritus of Geraldton
|-
|-
|align="center"| ||Michael Morrissey||align="center" |15 May 2017 ||align="center" |incumbent ||align="right"|  || ...
|-
|}

Other priest of this diocese who became bishop
Bryan Gallagher † , appointed Bishop of Port Pirie in 1952

Catholic Education

See also 

 List of Catholic dioceses in Australia
 Roman Catholicism in Australia

References

Sources and external links 
 Catholic Diocese of Geraldton
 GCatholic, with Google map & satellite photo - data for most sections

Roman Catholic Ecclesiastical Province of Perth
Roman Catholic dioceses in Australia
Mid West
1898 establishments in Australia
Roman Catholic dioceses and prelatures established in the 19th century
Religious organizations established in 1898